Bryce Allen Pinkham (born October 19, 1982) is an American actor and singer. He has appeared in the PBS period drama Mercy Street. On Broadway, he played Monty Navarro in A Gentleman's Guide to Love and Murder. For the latter role, he received nominations for a Tony Award for Best Performance by a Leading Actor in a Musical and a Grammy (Best Musical Theater Album). He is a Leonore Annenberg Arts Fellow and co-founder of Zara Aina, a not-for-profit children's theater company in Madagascar. He voiced Stolas in the adult animated web series Helluva Boss.

Personal life
Pinkham was born in Redding, California. He was raised in the East San Francisco Bay Area. He attended Campolindo High School in Moraga, California. He is a graduate of Boston College and the Yale School of Drama.

In 2012, Pinkham co-founded the not-for-profit children’s theater company Zara Aina (Share Life) with Lucas Caleb Rooney, to empower at-risk children in Madagascar.

In 2015, Pinkham said "I did musicals growing up as a kid, and it was always a dream to be in a Broadway musical, to play the lead in a Tony-winning musical."

He is an avid hiker and has hiked the Sierra Nevada Mountains as well as in New Zealand and Iceland.

Career
Pinkham had a few roles in Ghost: The Musical and Bloody Bloody Andrew Jackson on Broadway. In 2013, he originated the role of Monty Navarro in the Broadway production of A Gentleman's Guide to Love and Murder, for which he was nominated for a Tony Award for Best Performance by a Leading Actor in a Musical as well as a Grammy Award. He played the role on Broadway for over 700 performances. In 2014, he played Paul Revere in an introductory commercial titled Italian Invasion for the Fiat 500L, created by the Doner Company.

He played Peter Patrone in the Broadway revival of The Heidi Chronicles, and was nominated for an Outer Critics Circle Award and the Drama League Award for Distinguished Performance. In 2016, he returned to Broadway leading the cast of Roundabout Theatre Company's musical, Irving Berlin's Holiday Inn. His film and television appearances include as a series regular in the second season of the TV series Mercy Street, playing Major Clayton McBurney III, head of the Union Army hospital. Other roles include performances in the comedy The Comedian (2016) which stars Robert De Niro, and Baz Luhrmann's Netflix drama The Get Down. Previously, he has appeared on The Good Wife and Person of Interest. He appeared in the PBS miniseries God in America, "A Nation Reborn Drama" (2010). In 2012, Pinkham was awarded the Leonore Annenberg Fellowship given to "a limited number of exceptionally talented young dancers, musicians, actors and visual artists as they complete their training and begin their professional life.".

Pinkham currently voices Stolas, in the YouTube adult animated web series Helluva Boss.

Filmography

Theater

References

External links

1982 births
American male stage actors
American male voice actors
Living people
People from Redding, California
Yale School of Drama alumni
American people of British descent